Starmont High School is a rural public high school , part of the Starmont Community School District, located 5 miles south of Arlington, Iowa, six miles north of Lamont, Iowa, and six miles west of Strawberry Point, Iowa on a very large tract of land  in an area locally known as Maryville, at the intersection of Highway 187 and Highway 3.

The name is a portmanteau initialism: Strawberry Point + Arlington + Lamont, thus Starmont.

Athletics
The Stars compete in the Tri-Rivers Conference in the following sports:

Cross Country
Volleyball
Football
Basketball
Wrestling
Track and Field
 Boys' 2005 Class 2A State Champions
 Girls' 1982 Class 2A State Champions
Golf 

Baseball 
Softball

See also
List of school districts in Iowa
List of high schools in Iowa

References

External links
 Official website

Public high schools in Iowa
Schools in Fayette County, Iowa